Kjetil Bragli Alstadheim (born 26 September 1968) is a Norwegian journalist.

He was the managing director of Natur og Ungdom from 1987 to 1989 and journalist in Klassekampen from 1991 to 1995. After one year in Aftenposten he was a journalist in Dagens Næringsliv from 1996, political affairs editor from 2014 to 2020, and political affairs editor in Aftenposten from 2020.

References

1968 births
Living people
Writers from Oslo
Nature and Youth activists
21st-century Norwegian journalists
Klassekampen people
Dagens Næringsliv people
Aftenposten people